Erik Thomas von Detten (born October 3, 1982) is an American singer and former actor. He is known for his roles in Escape to Witch Mountain, Toy Story, Brink!, Meego, The Princess Diaries, Complete Savages, and So Weird. He voiced Erwin Lawson through the full run of Recess (1997-2001) and the series' four successive direct-to-video films.

Early life
Erik Thomas von Detten was born in San Diego, California, the son of Susan von Detten (née Farber), a photographer, and Volker von Detten. He has three sisters, Dolly, Britta and Andrea, and a brother, Timothy. He has German, English, and Russian Jewish ancestry. His family moved to a two-story house in El Segundo, California when he was a young child. In El Segundo, von Detten attended the local public elementary school, and was a member of the Cub Scouts.

Career
One of von Detten's earliest roles was Nicholas Alamain on the daytime soap opera Days of Our Lives from 1992 until 1993, appearing in 55 episodes. Nicholas was revealed to be the secret son of Lawrence Alamain (Michael Sabatino) and Carly Manning (Crystal Chappell), two of the show's major characters. As a result, von Detten was heavily involved in some of the show's main storylines, despite only being 10 years old.

In 1995, when he was 13, von Detten provided the voice of the villainous and heartless toy-tormentor Sid Phillips in Toy Story. He starred in the film Christmas Every Day in 1996, played Wally Cleaver in the 1997 film Leave It to Beaver, and in 1998, had the lead as the title character in the Disney Channel original movie Brink!. He followed this up on the television series So Weird , on which he played Clu Bell	 from 1999 to 2001. Von Detten also appeared in a theatrical release as Josh Bryant in The Princess Diaries in 2001. In addition, he has made several television appearances in shows such as Dinotopia (2002), the first celebrity edition of the ABC reality show The Mole, the third season's Celebrity Mole Hawaii (2003), and Fox's Malcolm in the Middle. Von Detten has also played the part of Chris Savage in the short-lived sitcom Complete Savages. 

In 2007, he made his stage debut in the children's play The Christmas Princess in Santa Monica. In 2009, he was featured in the music video "Wanted" by pop singer Jessie James. In 2010, he made a brief cameo appearance before he retired from acting  in Toy Story 3 reprising his role as Sid Phillips, who is now a garbageman in his 20s.

As of 2018, von Detten worked for Rosland Capital, a precious metals asset management firm. He is now a sales manager at a commodities brokerage firm.

Personal life
Von Detten has been married to his wife, Angela, a Taiwanese-American real estate agent, since 2018. They have a daughter, Claire Elizabeth (b. 2019), and a son, Thomas Henry (b. 2021).

Filmography

Film

Television

Video games

References

External links

 

1982 births
20th-century American male actors
21st-century American male actors
Male actors from San Diego
American male video game actors
American male voice actors
American male child actors
American male film actors
American people of English descent
American people of German descent
American people of Russian-Jewish descent
American male television actors
Living people
Participants in American reality television series